The Bletonesii were one of the pre-Roman Celtic peoples of the Iberian Peninsula (the Roman Hispania, modern Spain and Portugal), dwelling around the city of Bletisa or Bletisama, located in modern Ledesma in the province of Salamanca, Spain. They were punished by the Romans for practicing human sacrifice. If the placement in Bletisa is correct, they lived near (or they were part of) the Vettones.

See also
Vettones
Pre-Roman peoples of the Iberian Peninsula

References

Pre-Roman peoples of the Iberian Peninsula
Celtic tribes of the Iberian Peninsula
Ancient peoples of Spain